The 2010 Leinster Senior Football Championship was that year's installment of the annual Leinster Senior Football Championship held under the auspices of the Leinster GAA. It was won by Meath who defeated Louth in an eventful final on 11 July. A contentious goal was given. Irate Louth fans pursued the referee around the pitch at the final whistle, bottles were hurled from the stand and the mayhem was compared to soccer player Thierry Henry's handball that cheated the Irish soccer team of their place at the 2010 FIFA World Cup the previous November. Coincidentally, 11 July was also the date of the 2010 FIFA World Cup Final, which was played in South Africa later in the evening.

The winning Meath team received the Delaney Cup, and automatically advanced to the quarter-final stage of the 2010 All-Ireland Senior Football Championship. Kildare beat them there.

Bracket

Preliminary round

Quarter-finals

Semi-finals

Final

References

External links
 Leinster GAA website

2L
Leinster Senior Football Championship